Orbona fragariae is a moth of the family Noctuidae. It is found from central Europe, through Sibiria to the Pacific Ocean.

The wingspan is 54–62 mm. Adults are on wing from the end of August to May of the following year after overwintering. They are active during both day and night.

The larvae feed on various plants, including Plantago, Taraxacum, Galium, Clematis, Vicia, Salix and Prunus spinosa.

External links

 Fauna Europaea
 Lepiforum.de
 schmetterlinge-deutschlands.de

Xyleninae
Moths of Japan
Moths of Europe
Taxa named by Karl Friedrich Vieweg